Giovanni Intra (May 1968 – 17 December 2002) was an artist, writer, and art dealer who moved from his native New Zealand to the United States in 1996.

Life

Intra was born in Auckland in 1968 and grew up in Turangi, a small town in the centre of New Zealand's North Island, and Auckland where he attended Dilworth, a boys' school. He studied at the University of Auckland's Elam School of Fine Arts, completing a Bachelor of Fine Arts with a major in sculpture in 1990 and a Master of Fine Art in 1993. Curator Robert Leonard has described him as a 'precocious student': he established a reputation as a conceptual painter while still in his teens.

Intra was fascinated by Surrealist photography, such as the work of Jacques-André Boiffard, who was also a medical photographer. In his art work he investigated medicine, which he saw to have replaced religion as a source of hope for modern day society, and the frailties of the human body. His early work integrated ideas about culture text and body from non-Western sources; some of which were derived from his travels in India c. 1988. His use of text, voice and typography presages his later engagement with theory and criticism.

Intra became part of a collective of artists that established the influential Auckland artist-run space Teststrip in 1992.

In 1996 Intra was awarded a Fulbright scholarship and travelled to Los Angeles to study at the Art Center College of Design in Pasadena. He completed a master's degree in Critical Studies in 2001. His thesis was based on Daniel Paul Schreber's 1903 book Memoirs of My Nervous Illness (1903), and used texts by artists including Salvador Dalí and Robert Smithson to "suggest ways that art writing might be reinvented."

Art 
After leaving art school Intra was included in a number of public art gallery exhibitions. He was one of eight artists in the exhibition Shadows of Style curated by Greg Burke and Robert Leonard at the Wellington City Gallery. Three of the four Intra works from the exhibition: Nature Morte, 365 Days  and Studded Suit are now in public collections. Other public gallery exhibitions include Hospitals (1995) at Manawatu Art Gallery in Palmerston North and Nine Lives Auckland Art Gallery (2003) where art curator and writer Robert Leonard described Intra’s work as, "courting a peculiar beauty; scruffy, disdainful, yet marvelous."

Writing

Intra began writing about art for a magazine named Stamp while at art school in Auckland. At the time of his death Intra was West Coast editor for Art and Text, and helped edit the magazine Semiotext; his writing was published in Tema Celeste, Artforum, Bookforum and Flash Art. In September 2022 a collection of Intra's writings edited by Robert Leonard with a foreword by Chris Kraus and Mark von Schlegell and introduction by Andrew Berardini is published by Semiotext(e)

China Art Objects

In 1998 Intra and fellow art student Steve Hanson, who Intra worked with in the library at the Art Center, decided to start an artist-run gallery. They found a location in Los Angeles' Chinatown district and named the gallery China Art Objects, after a sign left by a previous tenant. The gallery opened in January 1999 and was the beginning of the transformation of Chung King Road as a contemporary art scene. China Art Objects became an influential dealer gallery, an early supporter of a number of Los Angeles artists.

Death

Intra died in Manhattan in December 2002, on a visit for the opening of an exhibition by one of China Art Objects' artists. In an obituary for Frieze Will Bradley wrote that Intra would be remembered "for his achievements as an artist, writer and co-founder of China Art Objects Galleries in Los Angeles, and equally for his enthusiasm, intelligence, integrity, warmth and all-around obvious decency".

In 2007 Intra's mother donated his archives to the Auckland Art Gallery. An exhibition based on the archive, Beginning in the Archive: Giovanni Intra 1968-2002, curated by Kate Brettkelly Chalmers, was staged at the Auckland gallery Artspace in 2008.

Public collections

Works by Intra are held in many public art collections in New Zealand and Australia, including:

Auckland Art Gallery
Christchurch Art Gallery
Dunedin Public Art Gallery
Govett-Brewster Art Gallery
Museum of New Zealand Te Papa Tongarewa
National Gallery of Victoria

References

1968 births
2002 deaths
People from Auckland
Drug-related deaths in New York City
Elam Art School alumni
New Zealand contemporary artists